= Barock am Main =

German theatre festival

Barock am Main is a theatre festival in Germany.
